Arenariomyces is a genus of fungi in the family Halosphaeriaceae. The genus contains five species.

References

Microascales